The 2005 Rolex Sports Car Series season was the sixth season of the Rolex Sports Car Series run by the Grand American Road Racing Association.  The format was reduced to two classes, Daytona Prototypes (DP) and Grand Touring (GT).  14 races were run from February 5, 2005 to November 5, 2005. Laguna-Seca and Hermanos Rodríguez were added. It set the record for the longest Rolex season.

Schedule

† - The DP and GT classes ran separate, individual races at Phoenix.

Results 
Overall winners in bold.

† - The DP and GT classes ran separate, individual races for DP and GT.

Championship standings

Source:

Daytona Prototypes

Drivers (Top 20)

Grand Touring

Drivers (Top 10)

References

External links
 The official website of Grand-Am
 Grand American Road Racing Association - 2005 season archive
 World Sports Racing Prototypes - Rolex Sports Car Series 2005 

Rolex Sports Car Series
Rolex Sports Car Series